Dead Sea 1618, established in 1890, is a company that trades in Dead Sea Minerals. The company started trading with Ottoman Empire, Russia, Lebanon and many countries

They first sold the products, based on alleged benefits of the mud & salt of the dead sea along with its popularly, their business was based on gathering these natural minerals from the nature & spread it all around the world.

References

Pharmaceutical companies of Jordan
Non-renewable resource companies established in 1890
Dead Sea
1890 establishments in Ottoman Syria